The Merimde culture (also Merimde Beni-Salame or Benisalam) was a Neolithic culture in the West Nile Delta in Lower Egypt, which corresponds in its later phase to the Faiyum A culture and the Badari culture in Predynastic Egypt. It is estimated that the culture evolved between 4800 and 4300 BC. Merimde also refers to the archaeological site of the same name.

Archaeological work
The culture was concentrated around Merimde Beni Salama, the main settlement site, located in the West delta of the Nile in Lower Egypt 45 km northwest of Cairo. The site was discovered by German archaeologist Hermann Junker, who excavated 6,400 m2 of the site during his West Nile Delta expedition in 1928.

Early on, the settlement had been considered to be ca. 25 hectares, but recent research expanded this to at least 40 hectares.

Later excavations in the 1970s performed by the Egyptian Antiquities Organization and the German Institute of Archaeology led to the establishment of the stratigraphical sequence.

Characteristics
Merimde shows a sequence of occupations which lasted almost a millennium according to some estimates. While Junker identified three sequences, others such as Joseph Eiwanger established in 1977 that there are five with significantly different levels of development. Artifacts such as ceramics were quite primitive during phase I – a phase characterized by a light occupation. Eiwanger documented that storage areas appeared during phase II when the intensity of the occupation increased.

Economy

Archaeological evidence suggests that the Merimde economy was dominated by agriculture although some fishing and hunting were practiced to a lesser degree. The settlement consisted of small huts made of wattle and reed with a round or elliptical ground plan. Merimde pottery lacked "rippled marks".

Burials
Burials had unique characteristics, different from those practiced in Upper Egyptian Predynastic Egypt and later Dynastic Egypt. There were no separate areas for cemeteries and the dead were buried within the settlement in a flexed position in oval pits without grave goods and offerings.

In the time of the Maadi culture, the place was used as a cemetery.

Excavations of Merimde burials have yielded a number of skeletons, chiefly those of females. The fossils are generally taller and more robust than later predynastic Egyptian specimens. In this regard, the Merimde skeletons are most similar to those associated with the Tasian culture. Furthermore, although the Merimde crania are dolichocephalic (long-headed) like many of the other predynastic skulls, they have a large and wide vault like the Tasian crania. Skulls excavated from Badarian, Amratian sites tend instead to be smaller and narrow.

Relative chronology

See also

Population history of Egypt

External links
University College London

References and notes

Neolithic cultures of Africa
Ancient Egyptian society
Predynastic Egypt
Nile Delta
5th-millennium BC establishments
5th-millennium BC disestablishments
Archaeological cultures in Egypt
Archaeological cultures of Africa